Dandy Dick is a 1935 British comedy film starring Will Hay. It was based on the 1887 play Dandy Dick by Arthur Wing Pinero. It is the second and last of his films to be based on a play by Arthur Wing Pinero – the first was Those Were the Days which was based on The Magistrate. Moore Marriott, who played an uncredited role in the film, later became a famous foil to Hay in films later on alongside Graham Moffatt, it was during the film of Dandy Dick that Marriott introduced the idea of being a supporting player to Hay.

Plot
A vicar who lives in the country with his daughter and grandson discovers he owns a share in a racehorse. He must now put his principles aside and attempt to save the church by gambling. A doping scandal ensues.

Partial Cast
Will Hay as Vicar the Rev. Richard Jedd
Nancy Burne as Pamela Jedd
Esmond Knight as Tony Mardon
Davy Burnaby as Sir William Mardon
 Mignon O'Doherty as Georgiana Jedd  
Wally Patch as Police Constable Topping
Moore Marriott as a  Stableboy (uncredited)

External links

1935 films
British black-and-white films
Films shot at British International Pictures Studios
1930s English-language films
Films directed by William Beaudine
1935 comedy films
British comedy films
1930s British films
English-language comedy films